Putzeysia franziskae is a species of sea snail, a marine gastropod mollusk in the family Eucyclidae.

Description

The shell can grow to be 3 mm to 4.2 mm in length.

Distribution
It can be found on the Canary Islands.

References

External links
 To Encyclopedia of Life
 To World Register of Marine Species

franziskae
Gastropods described in 2009